Townhall is the core part of the city of Coimbatore in Tamil Nadu, India. It is the largest and the major commercial hub in the city with locations such as Oppanakara Street, Raja Street, Ukkadam, VH Road and NH Road. The locality derives its name from the Victoria Town Hall, Coimbatore. It is centrally located in the city.

Geography
Townhall is located about 11 km from the Coimbatore International Airport, 1 km from City railway station, 4 km from Coimbatore North Junction, 3 km from Gandhipuram Central Bus Terminus, 10 km from Coimbatore Integrated Bus Terminus  and 8 km from Podanur railway station. Townhall shares its borders with Gandhipuram, Ramanathapuram, Selvapuram, Gandhipuram Karumbukadai, R. S. Puram and Uppilipalayam.

Economy
Townhall is a major commercial center in Coimbatore. It consists of various commercial enterprises and markets.

Infrastructure
The office of Coimbatore Corporation is located in Townhall at the Victoria Townhall building. To ease the traffic congestion, an overpass flyover is being constructed at a cost of ₹265 crore in Ukkadam.

Transport
Gandhipuram Central Bus Terminus and Ukkadam Bus Terminus are located at a distance of 3 km and 1 km respectively from Town Hall. Coimbatore Junction, which is one of the important railway stations in Southern Railway is located here.

Shopping
The two major shopping destinations within Townhall are Big Bazar Street and Oppanakara Street.

Temples
The Koniamman Temple, temple of guardian deity of the city is located here near to the CMC Building.

Locality
Townhall is very well connected to all the neighbourhoods in Coimbatore city with a bus terminus located at Ukkadam.

Politics
Townhall is a part of Coimbatore South (state assembly constituency) and Coimbatore (Lok Sabha constituency).

Hospitals
Coimbatore Government Hospital

Landmarks
Coimbatore Corporation Town Hall built in 1892 and Manikoondu are the important landmarks in the locality.

Coimbatore Metro
Coimbatore Metro feasibility study is completed and Ukkadam would be the hub for the metro trains with a three corridors towards Kaniyur, Coimbatore Integrated Bus Terminus and Bilichi. Whereas the other two corridors would pass through Ukkadam connecting Ganeshapuram with Karunya Nagar and connecting Karanampettai with Thaneerpandal.

References

Neighbourhoods in Coimbatore